Joe Faust may refer to:
 Joe Faust (athlete), American high jump athlete
 Joe Faust (politician), member of the Alabama House of Representatives
 Joe Clifford Faust, American author